The 1992 season was the first season of competitive football (soccer) in Lithuania as an independent nation since regaining independence from the Soviet Union in 1991.

Lietuvos Makabi Vilnius won that season's domestic cup.

National Leagues

A Lyga

I Lyga

Lithuanian Cup

Final

National team

Senior team

References

External links
1992/1993 season on RSSSF
National Team Results
RSSSF Baltic Cup 1992